Choerospondias is a genus of plants with two species, belonging to the family Anacardiaceae. Currently, Choerospondias axillaris is the only extant species in the genus.

Species
Choerospondias auriculata D.Chandra 
Choerospondias axillaris (Roxb.) B.L.Burtt & A.W.Hill

References

Anacardiaceae
Anacardiaceae genera